The Giedroyc doctrine or  Giedroyc–Mieroszewski doctrine  was a political doctrine that urged reconciliation among Central and Eastern European countries. It was developed by postwar Polish émigrés, and was named for Jerzy Giedroyc, a Polish émigré publicist, with significant contributions by Juliusz Mieroszewski for whom it is also sometimes named.

History
Giedroyc developed the doctrine in the 1970s in the journal Kultura with Juliusz Mieroszewski (the doctrine is sometimes called the Giedroyc-Mieroszewski doctrine) and other émigrés of the "Maisons-Laffitte group".  The doctrine can be traced to the interwar Prometheist project of Józef Piłsudski.

The doctrine urged the need to rebuild good relations among East-Central and East European countries. The doctrine also claimed that the preservation of independence by the new post-Soviet states that lie between Poland and the Russian Federation is a fundamental Polish long-term interest. This called for Poland to reject any imperial ambitions and controversial territorial claims, and to accept the postwar border changes. The doctrine supported independence for Belarus and Ukraine.  It also advocated treating all East European countries as equal in importance to Russia, and refusing special treatment for Russia.  The doctrine was not hostile to Russia, but called on both Poland and Russia to abandon their struggle over domination of other East European countries — in this context, mainly the Baltic states, Belarus, and Ukraine (hence another name for the doctrine: the "ULB doctrine", where "ULB" stands for "Ukraine, Lithuania, Belarus").

Initially it was addressing the attitude of the post-World War II Polish emigres, especially around the Polish government-in-exile in London, and basically calling for the recognition of the post-war status quo.  Later it was adapted towards the goal of the moving of Belarus, Ukraine and Lithuania away from the Soviet and later Russian sphere of influence.

The doctrine supported the European Union and aimed at removing East-Central and East European countries from the Soviet sphere of influence.  After Poland regained its independence from Soviet influence following the fall of communism in 1989, the doctrine was implemented in Poland's Eastern foreign policies.  Poland itself began integrating into  the European Union, eventually joining the EU in 2004.  Poland has likewise supported Ukrainian membership in the European Union and NATO. The doctrine has resulted in some tensions in Polish-Russian relations.  

The doctrine has been questioned by some commentators and politicians, particularly in the 21st century, and it has been suggested that in recent years the doctrine has been abandoned by the Polish Foreign Ministry.  Others, however, argue that the policy remains in force and is endorsed by the Polish Foreign Ministry.

See also
Intermarium (Międzymorze)
Polish Government in exile
Prometheism
Territorial changes of Poland

References

External links
„Jeśli nie ULB, to co? Doktryna Giedroycia w XXI w.” ("If Not ULB, Then What?  The Giedroyc Doctrine in the 21st Century", 17 June 2010)
Bartłomiej Sienkiewicz, "Pożegnanie z Giedroyciem" ("Farewell to Giedroyc", Rzeczpospolita, 28-05-2010).
Zdzisław Najder, [https://web.archive.org/web/20161114120556/http://www.new.org.pl/2010-06-10,abdoktryna_ulb_koncepcja_giedroycia_i_mieroszewskiego_w_xxi_wieku.html "'Doktryna ULB – koncepcja Giedroycia i Mieroszewskiego w XXI wieku"] ("The ULB Doctrine: Giedroyc's and Mieroszewski's Concept in the 21st century"). . 
Marcin Wojciechowski, "Co po Giedroyciu? Giedroyc!" ("What Comes after Giedroyc?  Giedroyc!"), Nowa Europa Wschodnia'' (New Eastern Europe), 1/2010, pp. 69–77.

Foreign relations of Poland
Polish People's Republic
History of Poland (1989–present)
Political history of Poland
Foreign policy doctrines
Aftermath of World War II in Poland